The following are the awards and nominations received by the actor and producer Ashton Kutcher.

Awards and nominations

Critics' Choice Movie Awards

Golden Raspberry Awards

Hollywood Film Award

Kid's Choice Awards

Las Vegas Film Critics Society

MTV Movie & TV Awards

People's Choice Awards

Screen Actors Guild Award

Teen Choice Awards

Young Artist Award

Notes

References

Kutcher, Ashton